Hamazkayin, short for Hamazkayin Armenian Educational and Cultural Society, is a major cultural organization of the Armenian Diaspora, with a presence in every significant Armenian community worldwide. In addition to organizing cultural events in local Armenian communities, the Hamazkayin runs three schools; publishes books through its printing press; maintains bookstores; publishes a monthly literary magazine, Pakin, organizes the Hamazkayin Forum and has established H-Pem of their Hamapem establishment. Hamazkayin enjoys the support of a wide segment of the Armenian community and encourages active participation to the events sponsored by the community.  Hamazkayin sponsors and organizes many cultural events; such as concerts by renowned artists, scientific seminars, film festivals, literary lectures and book reviews.  In the United States, the Hamazkayin Armenian Educational and Cultural Society was established as a non profit organization in 1970.

History 
The Hamazkayin Publishing and Cultural Society was founded on May 28, 1928, in Cairo, Egypt, by a group of nine Armenian intellectuals, including the writer and educator Levon Shant; historian, critic, and first Education Minister of Armenia, Nigol Aghbalian; former foreign minister of Armenia Dr. Hamo Ohanchanian; stage director and art critic Kasbar Ipegian, as well as Garabed and Drtad Malkhassian and Hagop Balekjian.

Schools 
 The M&H Aslanian secondary school (also known as Jemaran) in the East Beirut suburb of Antelias in Lebanon
 The Ecole Bilingue Hamazkayin school in Marseille, France
 The Arshag & Sophie Golstaun College in Sydney, Australia

Publishing 
Hamazkayin runs the Vahe Setian Printing Press in the Bourj Hammoud neighborhood of Beirut, Lebanon, along with the Hamazkayin Bookstore below it.  It also publishes the monthly literary magazine Pakine.

The Hamazkayin Forum 
Started in 1995, the Hamazkayin Forum is a 2-week cultural and educational trip for Armenian youth (mainly college-age students). From 1995 to 2001, the program was held at the Hamazkayin Nshan Palanjian educational institute in West Beirut, Lebanon. The 2002 forum featured one week in Lebanon and one week in Armenia. After that, the forum has been held entirely in Armenia.

H-Pem 

H-Pem (stylized as H-Pem) is a collaborative English-language Armenian cultural online platform and publication established by Hamapem of the Hamazkayin Armenian Educational and Cultural Society. Launched and made available to the public on May 13, 2019, H-Pem's mission is to reach Armenian communities around the world and help Armenians—particularly Armenian youth—(re)connect with their homeland and culture in new, creative, and cooperative ways.

History 
In 2014, Hamazkayin's seventh General Assembly outlined the imperative creation of an innovative online platform to more effectively implement the organization's mission and to reach Armenians in the diaspora—specifically the Diasporan Armenian youth.

Following the General Assembly, a committee was put forth by the Hamazkayin Central Executive and Loucig Srabian-Guloyan was soon appointed as the project manager. Prior to the platform's actual development, Guloyan-Srabian held consultations with English-speaking Armenian youth across North America and elsewhere, to better understand their needs.

The project was named "H-Pem" by combining "H" for the Hamazkayin Armenian Educational and Cultural Society, with "Pem," the Armenian word for "platform."

Lilly Torosyan joined H-Pem in 2017 as the assistant project manager and staff writer, while Rupen Janbazian joined the following year as the platform's editor, content manager, and data protection officer. Shahen Araboghlian, H-Pem's social media strategist and management assistant, joined in 2019.

H-Pem, as well as its social media accounts, were made available to the public on May 13, 2019.

Features 
Though most of the platform is open to the public, H-Pem features a free membership option, which allows users to comment on articles, to submit their work and recommendations, and to interact with other users.

H-Pem's content is divided into two main parts: "Featured content," which features pieces written by contributors, and "Your stage," a space in which users' work are highlighted.

The "Featured content" portion of the platform is H-Pem's online magazine, which includes stories, interviews, analyses, and profiles of Armenian cultural figures and achievers, as well as stories in pictures.

"Your stage" is an experimental space, which includes a multimedia guide and a submissions area, aspiring and established artists are encouraged to introduce and share their creative output. "Your stage" also features a section for collaborations with artists, writers, cultural executives, students, and graduates from multiple disciplines, as well as organizations, institutions, and community members, on focused projects.

The platform also features a section, which live streams Armenian cultural events around the world.

See also 
Nor Serount Cultural Association
H-Pem

References

External links 
Official website

Armenian culture
Armenian diaspora
Organizations established in 1928